Abhinayam is a 1981 Indian Malayalam film, directed by Baby.It was produced by B. P. Moideen[mukkam]. The film stars Jayan, Vidhubala, T Jayasree and Vanchiyoor Radha in the lead roles. The film has musical score by K. J. Yesudas and K. Raghavan. During the filming of Abhinayam, Jayan and Moideen became great friends and Jayan showed interest to make Moideen's life story as a film. Jayan wanted to play the character of Moideen and Moideen happily agreed to that. However, after a month, Jayan died in an accident while shooting for the film Kolilakkam.

Plot

Radha (Vidhubala) is a struggling drama artist living in a hut with her mentally unstable mother. Raghu (Jayan) is a recently widowed bank manager working in the same town. Raghu has a baby daughter who is being taken care by his in-laws who refuse to give him the custody of the child until he remarries. Raghu hatches a plan to get the custody of his baby daughter. He approaches Radha with a proposal to act as his wife for a few days in return of 5000 Rs.

Raghu takes Radha to his village where they are received by his in-laws (Prathapachandran and Philomina). Raghu and Radha manages to convince his in-laws that they are married. Radha develops maternal feelings for Raghu's baby daughter. Raghu and Radha also develop feelings for each other. On returning to the town with the baby daughter, Radha reveals her heart to Raghu. However, Raghu who wants to take care of his daughter himself, refuses to let Radha be part of their life. Radha, disheartened goes back to her home without accepting the remuneration Raghu offered.

Raghu later is confronted by his father-in-law who makes him realize his mistake. Raghu rushes to Radha's hut where he finds that Radha has committed suicide.

Cast
Jayan as Raghu
Vidhubala as Radha
T. Jayasree as Bindu
Vanchiyoor Radha
Radhadevi
Philomina
Prathapachandran
Pala Thankam
Vallathol Unnikrishnan
 mukkam Basi
 Nithyan
 Vinod
 Ravi Patteri
 Abu Sirkar
 Hameed Kodiyatoor
 Venugopal
 Johnson
 Bhagyalakshmi

Child Artist
 Rajeev
 Rajith
 Salin

Soundtrack
The music was composed by K. J. Yesudas and K. Raghavan and the lyrics were written by Bichu Thirumala and Vijayan.

References

External links
 

1981 films
1980s Malayalam-language films
Films directed by Baby (director)